Peng Wan-ru (13 July 1949 – 30 November 1996), also spelled Peng Wan-ju, was a feminist Taiwanese politician. The director of the Democratic Progressive Party's (DPP) Women's Affairs Department, Peng advocated for the safety and development of women. Peng married Horng Wann-sheng (a mathematics professor at NTNU) and they had a son together.

Murder
In November 1996, Peng disappeared in Kaohsiung, Taiwan; the public last saw her board a yellow Ford Telstar taxi after a DPP meeting the night prior to a DPP convention. She was discovered raped and murdered outside of an abandoned warehouse in Kaohsiung County (now part of Kaohsiung City); her body had more than 30 stab wounds. 

Despite an extensive investigation, the police were unable to solve the crime. At least 70,000 Taiwanese taxi drivers had their fingerprints analyzed in an effort to find Peng's killer. Horng said that he felt frustrated that the killer was not found. There have been numerous false leads since the murder.

In 2015, police received tips from the ex-girlfriend of a taxi driver surnamed Yang, who said that he had told her he had killed Peng. Although Yang did not match DNA samples taken from the crime scene, he did match several fingerprint characteristics.

The statute of limitations ran out in 2016, closing the case, which prompted some DPP lawmakers to propose the removal of the twenty-year statute for murder cases and major economic crimes.

Response and legacy
Peng's murder produced an outcry against the lack of protection women have in Taiwan. Peng's proposed quota for one-fourth of the seats of the elected seats to be reserved for women passed during the November 30, 1996 DPP National Congress meeting; the public believes that Peng died during that day.

Peng's death, along with two other well-publicized murder cases, led to mass demonstrations in May 1997. Demonstrators marched on 4 May 1997 and 18 May 1997, demanding Premier Lien Chan's resignation over the perceived rise in violent crime as evidenced by the then-unsolved murders of Pai Hsiao-yen, Peng Wan-ru, and Liu Pang-yu.

The Peng Wan-ru Foundation, an organization named after Peng and established in 1997 by Peng's husband, supports women wishing to enter the labour force. It trains women for participation in their child-care programs; once they have passed the courses, the Foundation matches them with households or elementary schools in need of child care.

References

External links
 In Memory of Peng Wan-ru - New Taiwan
 In Memory of Peng Wan-Ru - A Proposal for the Women's Rights Day - Womenet
 The Death of a Leading Feminist Advocate: The Cry for a Secure Society for Women - 1996 Taiwan Women Camp Committee
 Taiwan Review - S-E-X Sells - Taiwan Review
 Peng Wan-ru Foundation 

1949 births
1996 deaths
20th-century Taiwanese women politicians
Taiwanese feminists
Democratic Progressive Party (Taiwan) politicians
Taiwanese murder victims
People murdered in Taiwan
Deaths by stabbing in Taiwan
Politicians of the Republic of China on Taiwan from Hsinchu
Assassinated politicians
1990s murders in Taiwan
1996 crimes in Taiwan
1996 murders in Asia
Violence against women in Taiwan